Eucosmophora manilkarae is a moth of the family Gracillariidae. It is known from Florida and Texas in the United States.

The length of the forewings is 3.3–3.5 mm for males and 3–4 mm for females.

The larvae feed on Bumelia celastrina and Manilkara bahamensis. They mine the leaves of their host plant. On Manilkara bahamensis, the mines occur on the underside of young, yellow-green, still expanding leaves. The serpentine early track often has a reddish orange frass stain that occasionally zigzags from side to side. The mine tends to be dirty brown and rather opaque. Often, there are numerous small tears in the mine that may or may not be sealed over by the larva with a thin webbing of silk. The last two instars mine deeply into the parenchyma, causing discoloration which is visible from above. Mature mines may have an abundance of minute creasing over the lower leaf surface. On Bumelia celastrina, the mine begins as a narrow track that follows a leaf edge or snakes about the lamina. This portion of mine appears almost free of frass except for some subtle staining on the outer mine surface. By the second instar, the mine, often with a dark central channel stained by frass, may repeatedly cross itself, especially in smaller leaves. In the third instar the mine is enlarged into a blotch that occupies most of the lamina. The dark, tacky frass that  adheres to the outer mine surface renders most of the mine opaque. In the last two instars, silk is used to draw the edges of the mine together. Many upper surface mines abort possibly because the larva is unable to draw the leaf edges upward. In lower surface mines the leaf tip is drawn back toward the petiole, lower right leaf. So much silk may be deposited within the mine that the lower leaf surface appears white.

Etymology
The specific name is derived from the generic name, Manilkara, one of two principal larval hosts.

References

Acrocercopinae
Moths described in 2005